The 1992 Texas Tech Red Raiders football team represented Texas Tech University as a member of the Southwest Conference (SWC) during the 1992 NCAA Division I-A football season. In their sixth season under head coach Spike Dykes, the Red Raiders compiled a 5–6 record (4–3 against SWC opponents), finished in a tie for second place in the conference, and were outscored by a combined total of 332 to 287. The team played its home games at Clifford B. and Audrey Jones Stadium in Lubbock, Texas.

Schedule

References

Texas Tech
Texas Tech Red Raiders football seasons
Texas Tech Red Raiders football